The 1990 United States Senate election in New Mexico was held on November 5, 1990. Incumbent Republican U.S. Senator Pete Domenici won re-election to a fourth term.

Major candidates

Democratic 
 Tom Benavidez, state senator

Republican 
 Pete Domenici, incumbent U.S. Senator

Results

See also 
 1990 United States Senate elections

References 

New Mexico
1990
1990 New Mexico elections